Elachista stelviella is a moth in the family Elachistidae. It was described by Hans Georg Amsel in 1932. It is found in South Tyrol, Italy.

References

Moths described in 1932
stelviella
Moths of Europe